David Carnegie, 4th Earl of Northesk (1675 – 14 January 1729) was a Scottish peer and politician.

He was born the son of David Carnegie, 3rd Earl of Northesk and Elizabeth Lindsay. He was invested as a Privy Councillor of Scotland in 1698 and held the office of Sheriff of Forfar in 1702. He held the office of Lord Commissioner of Treasury for Scotland from 1705 until 1708. He served as a representative peer between 1708 and 1715 and was Commissioner of Trade and Manufacturers in 1711.

He married Lady Margaret Wemyss, daughter of James Wemyss, Lord Burntisland and Margaret Wemyss, 3rd Countess of Wemyss, on 29 January 1697 and had five children:

Elizabeth Carnegie (2 January 1699 – 21 September 1767)
David Carnegie, 5th Earl of Northesk (11 June 1701 – 24 June 1741)
Margaret Carnegie (1702–7 July 1722)
Admiral George Carnegie, 6th Earl of Northesk (2 August 1716 – 20 January 1792)
Anne Carnegie (1729)

References 

1675 births
1729 deaths
David 04
Scottish representative peers
Commissioners of the Treasury of Scotland
Members of the Privy Council of Scotland
Scottish sheriffs